The Chechiș is a right tributary of the river Lăpuș in Maramureș County, Romania. It flows into the Lăpuș near the village Chechiș.

References

Rivers of Romania
Rivers of Maramureș County